Blaine Alphonsus Durbin (September 10, 1886 – September 11, 1943), nicknamed "Danny Dreamer," was an American Major League Baseball outfielder. He was born in Lamar, Missouri.

Major League career 

Durbin made his Major League debut on April 24, 1907, for the Chicago Cubs. That season, he appeared in five games as a pitcher, going 0–1 with a save. He also played the outfield in five games that season. Durbin played for the Cubs during their 1907 and 1908 pennant-winning seasons but did not play in either World Series. Before being traded to the Cincinnati Reds on January 18, 1909 (together with Tom Downey for outfielder John Kane), Durbin had a batting average of only .250 in 14 games, and on May 28, after appearing in only six games for Cincinnati, he was shipped to the Pittsburgh Pirates, doing little more than ride the bench before being released scarcely one month later. Durbin appeared only once (and for the final time in a Major League uniform), as a pinch-runner representing the potential tying run in the ninth inning of a 3-2 loss to Chicago, on June 30, 1909, in the first game ever played at Forbes Field.

Later life 

After playing a few years in Minor League Baseball, Durbin retired as a baseball player. Just one day after his 57th birthday on September 11, 1943, Durbin died in Kirkwood, Missouri. His burial is located at Saint Peters Cemetery in Kirkwood at St. Louis County in Missouri. Durbin was memorialized as the protagonist in the fictional novel The Best Team Ever (2008) by Alan Alop and Doc Noel.

References

Further reading 
 "Blaine Durbin a Find". The Pittsburgh Press. April 7, 1907. 
 "Chance Likes Young Durbin; Cubs Manager Undecided Whether to Use the Promising Southpaw as a Slab Artist or an Outfielder". The Pittsburgh Press. June 27, 1907.
 "Blaine Durbin Valuable Player". The Pittsburgh Press. July 13, 1908.
 "He Is Up in the Air: Clark Griffith Doesn't Know Whether to Make an Outfielder or a Pitcher Out of Blaine Durbin". Fort Scott Daily Tribune. March 22, 1909.
 "Ward Miller to Join Reds at Cincinnati on Sunday; Blaine Durbin Will Report Here Tonight; New Pirate Is Good Hitter and Clever Sprinter". The Pittsburgh Press. May 28, 1909.
 "Blaine Durbin's Rise and Fall". The Neodesha Daily Sun. August 17, 1910.
 "Durbin Hasn't 'Come Back'; Brick Pavements Put Midget Pitcher Out Says Pittsburg Headlight Writer". Fort Scott Daily Tribune. March 6, 1912.
 "Oaks Win Ninth Straight Game and Take Commanding Lead in Pennant Race; Around the Bases". The Oakland Tribune. April 14, 1913.
 "Blaine Durbin Embarks on Stock Raising Career". Miami Record-Herald. November 13, 1914.

External links 

 SABR biography

1886 births
1943 deaths
Major League Baseball outfielders
Chicago Cubs players
Cincinnati Reds players
Pittsburgh Pirates players
Fort Scott Giants players
Joplin Miners players
St. Joseph Saints players
Scranton Miners players
Omaha Rourkes players
Topeka Jayhawks players
Oakland Oaks (baseball) players
Baseball players from Missouri
People from Lamar, Missouri